Aflavinine is an anti-insectan chemical compound produced by some plants and fungi.

References

Indole alkaloids